Another Late Night: Fila Brazillia is a DJ mix album, mixed by Fila Brazillia and is the first release in the Another Late Night / Late Night Tales DJ series. The album features songs that, as the band puts it, "represent some of the individuality and invention that has inspired us over the last twenty-odd years." With many of the albums in the series featuring a cover performed by the artist hosting, the band chose to cover "Nature Boy" by Nat King Cole, a song they heard a great amount during childhood. AllMusic praised the album, claiming it as "both an excellent introduction to the band's idiosyncrasies and a tacit triumph of naked eclecticism in its own right."

Track listing
 "The Persuaders! Theme" - John Barry
 "Firefly" - Homelife
 "Hero Theme" - The Infesticons
 "Bucket Bottom" - Prince Alla
 "Get a Move On" - Mr. Scruff
 ""T" Plays It Cool" - Marvin Gaye
 "Regiment" - Brian Eno and David Byrne (from My Life in the Bush of Ghosts)
 "It's Not Too Beautiful" - The Beta Band
 "Rodney Yates" - David Holmes
 "Nature Boy" - Fila Brazillia
 "Nuclear Symphony" - Unforscene
 "Les Nuits" - Nightmares on Wax
 "Blue Sky" - Outside
 "Suspended" - Kelis
 "Prelude & Fugue In C Minor" - The Swingle Singers

References

Fila Brazillia
2001 compilation albums
Fila Brazillia albums